Pelochyta pallida is a moth of the family Erebidae. It was described by William Schaus in 1901. It is found in Ecuador, Peru and Bolivia.

References

Pelochyta
Moths described in 1901